Frank Tate (born August 27, 1964, in Detroit, Michigan) is a former American professional boxer.

Amateur career
Tate was the 1983 National Golden Gloves light middleweight champion. Tate was training at the Kronk Gym. He also won the light middleweight gold medal at the 1984 Summer Olympics even though he had standing eight-counts administered to him twice in the second round of the gold medal bout against Canadian fighter Shawn O'Sullivan.

Olympic results 
1st round bye
Defeated Lotfi Ayed (Sweden) 5–0
Defeated Romolo Casamonica (Italy) 5–0
Defeated Christopher Kapopo (Zambia) RSC 1
Defeated Manfred Zielonka (West Germany) by walkover
Defeated Shawn O'Sullivan (Canada) 5–0

Professional career

Middleweight
Tate began his professional career in December 1984. At 20–0, Tate won the vacant IBF middleweight title by beating Michael Olajide over fifteen rounds at Caesars Palace, Las Vegas in October 1987.  Tate successfully defended his title against Tony Sibson with a tenth round stoppage in Staffordshire, England, before losing his belt to undefeated phenom Michael Nunn in nine rounds at Caesars Palace in July 1988.

Super-middleweight
In January 1990 at Municipal Auditorium, New Orleans, Louisiana, Tate boxed Lindell Holmes for the vacant IBF super-middleweight title, losing a close majority decision.

Light-heavyweight
Following the defeat, Tate moved up to light-heavyweight and defeated Uriah Grant and Andrew Maynard on a six fight win streak to set up a fight for the vacant WBA title against Virgil Hill in 1992.  Tate lost a unanimous decision.  After four more wins, Tate was granted a rematch with Hill in 1994 but again lost a convincing decision.  This was Tate's last major fight, and after several victories over limited competition he was stopped in four rounds against David Telesco in his final pro bout.

Professional boxing record

See also
List of world middleweight boxing champions

References

External links

Interview with Olympic Gold Medal Winner: Frank Tate, 1984-12-11, In Black America; KUT Radio, American Archive of Public Broadcasting (WGBH and the Library of Congress)

1964 births
Living people
American male boxers
African-American boxers
Boxers from Detroit
Olympic boxers of the United States
Boxers at the 1984 Summer Olympics
Olympic gold medalists for the United States in boxing
Medalists at the 1984 Summer Olympics
National Golden Gloves champions
Winners of the United States Championship for amateur boxers
Middleweight boxers
Super-middleweight boxers
Light-heavyweight boxers
World middleweight boxing champions
International Boxing Federation champions
21st-century African-American people
20th-century African-American sportspeople